Bridget Pickering (born 1966) is a film maker and producer from Namibia. Among other projects, she was an executive producer on the 2004 film Hotel Rwanda. She is the daughter of Namibian diplomat and trade unionist, Advocate Arthur Pickering.

She attended college at Syracuse University in the United States and worked for Universal Pictures before returning to Namibia. Her father is Namibian and her mother from South Africa. In 1999, she was one of six women chosen to direct a short film for the Mama Africa series. Her contribution, Uno's World, is about a young woman dealing with an unplanned pregnancy.

References

External links
 

Namibian film producers
1966 births
Living people
Syracuse University alumni
Place of birth missing (living people)
Namibian film directors

Namibian women